is a Japanese idol who is represented by the talent agency Asche.

Biography
Morishita was born in Hachiōji, Tokyo in 1985. Her father is from Saitama Prefecture, and her mother is from Tokyo. She went to elementary school in Hachiōji, and later went to another elementary school six years later in Saitama Prefecture. After graduating from high school, Morishita went to Atomi Junior College, Tokyo. She hoped to become a flight attendant, but after graduating from Atomi Junior College in 2005, she was invited to News Promotion.

Filmography

TV series

Films

References

External links
  
 Official profile 

Japanese female models
Japanese gravure models
Japanese actresses
Japanese television personalities
Japanese women pop singers
1985 births
Living people
People from Hachiōji, Tokyo
21st-century Japanese singers
21st-century Japanese women singers